Stutzheim-Offenheim is a commune in the Bas-Rhin department in Grand Est in north-eastern France.

On 1 May 1972, Stutzheim-Offenheim was created as a fusion of Stutzheim and Offenheim.

See also
 Communes of the Bas-Rhin department
 Kochersberg

References

External links

 Official site

Communes of Bas-Rhin